"Don't Hold Back On Love" is a song recorded by Swedish Greek singer-songwriter Helena Paparizou. The song was released on May 1, 2014 as the final single from Paparizou's third English-language album, One Life (2014).

Background and release 
Paparizou performed the single for the first time live at The Voice of Greece. The song was written by Jimmy Jansson and Micah Wilshire.

Music video 
Helena began shooting the music video for the song in July, Athens. It is a clip with futuristic and advanced view. We see Helena in a modern car wearing black leather pants with metal design illustrations. The video director is Alexandros Grammatopoulos. The music video premiered on Helena's vevo on July 30.

References

External links 

Helena Paparizou songs
Eurodance songs
2014 singles
2014 songs
English-language Swedish songs
Songs written by Jimmy Jansson